Alexander Cribley (born 1 April 1957) is an English former footballer who played as a central defender. He spent the majority of his playing career at Wigan Athletic, and made over 250 appearances for the club. He is now part of the staff at Wigan, working as a physiotherapist. He was part of the team that won the Associate Members' Cup in 1985.

References

External links
 
 Alex Cribley Wigan Athletic

1957 births
Living people
English footballers
Association football defenders
English Football League players
Liverpool F.C. players
Wigan Athletic F.C. players
Footballers from Liverpool
Association football physiotherapists
Wigan Athletic F.C. non-playing staff